Meet Me on the Left Coast is the third studio EP by rock band The Summer Set, that was released on December 12, 2008, by The Militia Group.

Track listing
"Love on Our Mind" - 2:34
"Can You Find Me" - 3:10
"L.I.T.C." - 3:43

References

Amazon
emusic

2008 EPs
The Summer Set EPs